The men's 200 metre freestyle event at the 1988 Summer Olympics took place on 18–19 September at the Olympic Park Swimming Pool in Seoul, South Korea. There were 63 competitors from 41 nations, with each nation having up to two swimmers.

Australia's Duncan Armstrong set a new world record to win the Olympic title in the event. Swimming in lane six and coming from third at the final turn, he edged out a vastly experienced field for the gold medal in 1:47.25. His time also sliced 0.19 seconds off the global standard set by West Germany's Michael Gross at the 1984 Summer Olympics in Los Angeles.

Sweden's Anders Holmertz overtook U.S. swimmer Matt Biondi about midway through the final stretch, but could not catch Armstrong near the wall to finish with a silver in 1:47.89. It was Sweden's first medal in the men's 200 metre freestyle. Leading almost the entire race, Biondi faded down the stretch to break the 1:48 barrier and take the bronze at 1:47.99.

Poland's Artur Wojdat, a top qualifier on the morning preliminaries, dropped off the podium to a fourth-place time in 1:48.40. Meanwhile, Gross missed a chance to defend his Olympic title with a fifth-place finish in 1:48.59.

Background

This was the eighth appearance of the 200 metre freestyle event. It was first contested in 1900. It would be contested a second time, though at 220 yards, in 1904. After that, the event did not return until 1968; since then, it has been on the programme at every Summer Games.

Two of the 8 finalists from the 1984 Games returned: gold medalist Michael Gross and bronze medalist Thomas Fahrner, both of West Germany. Gross was the two-time reigning World Champion as well, with wins in the 1982 and 1986 World Aquatics Championships. American Matt Biondi had taken bronze at the 1986 World Championships; he was a strong challenger even though his best races were at 100 metres. 1987 European champion Anders Holmertz of Sweden was also among the podium favourites; Duncan Armstrong of Australia was not a pre-race favourite.

Belgium, Guam, Luxembourg, Malaysia, Singapore, South Korea, and the United Arab Emirates each made their debut in the event. Australia made its eighth appearance, the only nation to have competed in all prior editions of the event.

Competition format

The competition used a two-round (heats, final) format. The advancement rule followed the format introduced in 1952. A swimmer's place in the heat was not used to determine advancement; instead, the fastest times from across all heats in a round were used. There were 8 heats of up to 8 swimmers each. The top 8 swimmers advanced to the final. The 1984 event had also introduced a consolation or "B" final; the swimmers placing 9th through 16th in the heats competed in this "B" final for placing. Swim-offs were used as necessary to break ties.

This swimming event used freestyle swimming, which means that the method of the stroke is not regulated (unlike backstroke, breaststroke, and butterfly events). Nearly all swimmers use the front crawl or a variant of that stroke. Because an Olympic-size swimming pool is 50 metres long, this race consisted of four lengths of the pool.

Records

Prior to this competition, the existing world and Olympic records were as follows.

The following records were established during the competition:

Schedule

All times are Korea Standard Time adjusted for daylight savings (UTC+10)

Results

Heats
Rule: The eight fastest swimmers advance to final A (Q), while the next eight to final B (q).

Finals

There were two finals, one for the top 8 swimmers and one for the next 8 (9th through 16th).

Final B

Final A

References

External links
 Official Report
 USA Swimming

Swimming at the 1988 Summer Olympics
200 metre freestyle at the Olympics
Men's events at the 1988 Summer Olympics